Aed Carabao is the stage name of Yuenyong Opakul, born 9 November 1954. He is a singer/songwriter and leader of the Thai rock band Carabao, known for its songs in the "songs for life" genre.

In October 2022, the governor of Suphan Buri province filed a defamation complaint with Thai police; Yuenyong Opakul "called the governor names as he slammed him for not inviting him to play at an annual fair in" his hometown; Yuenyong Opakul has apologized.

History

Early life
He was born in a Thai Teochew Chinese middle-class family in Tambon Tha Phi Liang, Mueang Suphan Buri, Suphan Buri Province in central region of Thailand. He is the third generation of overseas Chinese immigrants living in Thailand. His grandfather came from a small village in the Fengshun, Meizhou north of Han River, Guangdong Province. His father's name Manus Opakul, who was highly regarded in the local area as a local sage. He was a merchant, look thung (Thai country music) band manager, writer, local historian and was the pioneer of first Suphan Buri local newspaper.

As a youngster, Yuenyong (Aed) was exposed to the music of central Thailand: call and response songs, Thai folk music, Thai dancing, and look thung which his father was a band manager. When Yeunyong was a teenager he was influenced by Western music, and learned to play Western musical instruments. These were influences he drew on as a musician.

He wrote in his autobiography that as a child he had dive in the Tha Chin River that flows through behind his house. He caught a rare species Siamese tigerfish and sold it to an aquarium shop.
 
Yuenyong began primary education at Wat Suwan School, then left for further studies in Bangkok. He continued on in his studies at Uthenthawai Vocational School (now's Rajamangala Institute, Uthenthawai Campus), where he majored in architecture. Then he continued in architecture for one year at the Mapúa Institute of Technology in the Philippines.

In the Philippines, Yuengyong Opakul met Kirati Promsakha Na Sakon Nakhon, or Keo, another Thai student. They listened to the music of Led Zeppelin, John Denver, the Eagles, and Peter Frampton from records that a third friend, Sanit Limsila, or Kai, had accumulated. All three agreed to set up a band with the name "Carabao" to perform folk music at the institute.

When Yuenyoung Opakul graduated and returned to Thailand, he found work as an architect. Later, when Kai and Keo returned from the Philippines, all three met to play music together again in the Windsor Hotel restaurant in central Bangkok. They played at the Hotel Mandarin Samyan on weekends. All three friends were fired from their jobs for skipping work without notice.

Jobless, Kai left the group to work in south Thailand. Aed and Keo stayed and continued playing music together with the band Hope. In 1980, Yuenyong was working as an architect in an office managing a National Housing Authority project. Keo was working as an engineer for a Filipino company opening a branch in Thailand. Together, they played music in the evenings at a bar in the Ambassador Hotel Sukhumvit.

Achieving stardom

Aed produced the first album of the group Hammer in 1979. With this album, Hammer became known. In 1980, Aed composed the song "Teuk Kwaai Tui" ('Wild Buffalo') for Hammer to record for their album Bpak Dtai Baan Rao ('Our Southern Home'). That album vaulted Hammer to fame. Later, Aed worked with Hammer to come out with an album named Khanchanmueang with a folk-look thung musical style. He participated in composing songs for a movie starring the singer Phonom Napon in 1981.

Aed got together with Keo and produced their first album under the name "Carabao" in 1981. The album, Kee Mao ('The Drunkard'), achieved little notice. So the band toured, playing in cinemas across the country to small audiences.
 
Carabao became successful with their fifth album, Made in Thailand (1984), selling five million copies, and making  "Aed Carabao" a household name in Thailand. It wasn't until he made it big that he quit his day job as an architect, a job he has said he enjoyed very much. He has since toured in Europe, Japan, and the US.

Aed has written and performed no fewer than 900 songs, making him one of the most prolific singer–songwriters in the world.

Social role

Aed has not limited himself to the role of song artist only, but also hosts television programs and composes music for movies. He has acted in several movies and has composed musical public service announcements on issues or to advertise a project.

Aed is a keen observer of the Thai political and social scene. He has composed songs on salient events affecting the country: 
"Khri Kha Pra Cha Chon" ('Who Killed People') and "Ratchadamnoen" ('Ratchadamnoen') inspired by the events of Black May 1992
"Khwan Thai Jai Neung Deaw" ('Thai Axe, All for One') about the South Thailand insurgency
"Tsunami" inspired by the 2004 Indian Ocean earthquake and tsunami,
"When Whak" ('Punctuate') arising from the 2005–06 Thai political crisis,
"Jed Tula Lod Thong Kreung Sao" ('7 October, Half-mast') stemming from the 2008–2010 Thai political crisis, 
"Thep Pa Chao Dan Khun Thot" ('God of Dan Khun Thot') from the death of Luang Por Koon Paritsuttho.

Carabao Dang
Carabao Dang (CBD), a business for manufacturing, marketing, and selling energy drinks, was incorporated in 2001. The company was a joint investment by Mr Sathien Setthasit, Miss Nutchamai Thanombooncharoen, and Aed Carabao.  Aed serves as "brand ambassador" for Carabao Dang.

Honors
 In 2013, Aed received an honorary doctorate in Thai popular music from Ramkhamhaeng University.

References

External links
Homepage of Carabao and Aed Carabao 
 

1954 births
National Artists of Thailand
Thai people of Chinese descent
Living people
Thai guitarists
21st-century Thai male singers
20th-century Thai male singers
Thai singer-songwriters
Thai male film actors
Thai male television actors
People from Suphan Buri province
Mapúa University alumni
Thai twins
Thai architects
Carabao (band)